Del Sol Press is a publishing company founded by  Michael Neff in 2002.  The first book published by them was a revision of Michael Brodsky's 1978 novel, Detour.  Since that time Del Sol Press has gone on to publish work by Nin Andrews, David Blair, Joan Houlihan, Ander Monson, Don Thompson, Walter Cummins, and Thomas Kennedy, among others.  

Del Sol Press seeks to publish work by both new and recognized writers, as well as republish literary works that have gone out of print. Emphasis is on original, unique, and accessible work. DSP also publishes literary SFF novels, among them, Mall by Pattie Palmer-Baker, Piper Robbin and the American Oz Maker by Warwick Gleeson, Die Back by Richard Hacker, and Karma City by Gardner Browning. An earlier SFF from 2017, War of the World Makers by Reilly Michaels, won four national book awards, including the Beverly Hills Book Award for Best SF.

External links
Del Sol Press
Beverly Hills Book Awards
Poets and Writers Small Press Database
Publisher's Marketplace
The Book Depository
Press Reader

Book publishing companies of the United States
Publishing companies established in 2002
American companies established in 2002